Pribačevo is a village in the municipality of Kočani, North Macedonia. It used to be part of the former municipality of Orizari.

Demographics
According to the 2002 census, the village had a total of 388 inhabitants. Ethnic groups in the village include:

Macedonians 388

References

Villages in Kočani Municipality